Mohammadi (also Romanized as Moḩammadī and Muhammadi; also known as Moḩammadī-ye ‘Askarī) is a village in Rudhaleh Rural District, Rig District, Ganaveh County, Bushehr Province, Iran. At the 2006 census, its population was 465, in 105 families.

References 

Populated places in Ganaveh County